This is part of the list of Australian diarists of World War I, covering diarists with family names beginning with "A" through to "G".

References

 
Australian military personnel of World War I
Diarists of World War I